Newton is a city in Newton County, Mississippi. The population was 3,195 in the 2020 census.

Geography
Newton is located south of I-20 and U.S. Route 80 approximately 25 miles west of Meridian in south central Newton County. Potterchitto Creek flows past the west and north sides of the city.

Demographics

2020 census

As of the 2020 United States Census, there were 3,195 people, 1,305 households, and 877 families residing in the city.

2008
As of 2008, there were 3,674 people, 1,420 households, and 971 families residing in the city. The population density was 516.7 people per square mile (199.5/km). There were 1,638 housing units at an average density of 228.8 per square mile (88.3/km). The racial makeup of the city was 43.90% White, 54.69% African American, 0.14% Native American, 0.62% Asian, 0.19% from other races, and 0.46% from two or more races. Hispanic or Latino of any race were 0.87% of the population.

There were 1,420 households, out of which 30.8% had children under the age of 18 living with them, 42.1% were married couples living together, 22.3% had a female householder with no husband present, and 31.6% were non-families. 29.5% of all households were made up of individuals, and 14.0% had someone living alone who was 65 years of age or older. The average household size was 2.50 and the average family size was 3.07.

In the city, the population was spread out, with 27.4% under the age of 18, 9.4% from 18 to 24, 24.4% from 25 to 44, 19.6% from 45 to 64, and 19.2% who were 65 years of age or older. The median age was 37 years. For every 100 females, there were 80.4 males. For every 100 females age 18 and over, there were 74.3 males.

The median income for a household in the city was $30,067, and the median income for a family was $32,527. Males had a median income of $26,471 versus $19,333 for females. The per capita income for the city was $15,476. About 20.1% of families and 24.9% of the population were below the poverty line, including 35.2% of those under age 18 and 17.6% of those age 65 or over.

Education
The City of Newton is served by the Newton Municipal School District.

History 
The Battle of Newton's Station was fought here on April 24, 1863 during Grierson's Raid of the American Civil War.

On February 13, 1948, a tornado, with an estimated intensity of F3 on the Fujita scale, impacted the town, killing five people and destroying 30 homes.

Notable people
 Oree Banks, head football coach at South Carolina State University from 1965 to 1972 and at West Virginia State University from 1977 to 1983
 James Evans, member of the Mississippi House of Representatives from the 70th District
 Stan Hindman, former professional American football defensive lineman in the National Football League for seven seasons for the San Francisco 49ers
 Jimbeau Hinson, country music singer-songwriter
 Shorty McWilliams, former player for the Pittsburgh Steelers
 Paul Overstreet, country singer/songwriter
 Richard Parks, fantasy, science fiction and horror writer
 Elton Watkins, Congressman representing Oregon's 3rd congressional district from 1923 to 1925

References

External links
City of Newton
Newton Chamber of Commerce
County Website

Cities in Mississippi
Cities in Newton County, Mississippi